Saw Oo was viceroy of Toungoo (Taungoo) from 1397 to 1399. He succeeded his father Phaungga following his father's death. But Saw Oo was still a youngster, and was removed from office about two years later by King Swa Saw Ke, who wanted a more experienced governor.

He is also known as "Ya Kya Saw Oo" (ရာကျ စောဦး, "Saw Oo who lost the office").

References

Bibliography
 
 

Ava dynasty